Ostreola is a genus of fungi in the family Mytilinidiaceae. This is a monotypic genus, containing the single species Ostreola consociata.

Ostreola may also be used to refer to also a genus of oyster in the family Ostreidae; however, this name is unaccepted and Ostrea should be used instead.

References

External links 
Index Fungorum

Mytilinidiales
Monotypic Dothideomycetes genera